Thomas Ender (3 November 1793, Vienna - 28 September 1875, Vienna) was an Austrian landscape painter and watercolorist.

Life and work 
He was born to Johann Ender, a junk dealer, and was the twin brother of Johann Nepomuk Ender, a history painter. He and his brother were both enrolled at the Academy of Fine Arts, Vienna, where he began by studying history painting with Hubert Maurer, but switched to landscape painting with Laurenz Janscha then, after Janscha's death in 1812, with Joseph Mössmer. He was awarded the Academy's first prize for landscape drawing.

In 1817, after several study trips, he was awarded the "Great Painter's Prize". The winning canvas was purchased by Prince Klemens von Metternich, who became Ender's patron. This made it possible for him to take part in the Austrian Brazilian Expedition, during which he made over 700 drawings and watercolors. After his return, he accompanied Metternich to Rome and remained there, on a government pension, until 1823. After that, he worked for Metternich in Salzkammergut and became a member of the Academy in 1824. Two years later, he made a study trip to Paris.

He was named a court painter to Archduke John in 1828. He accompanied him on a trip to the Middle East and Southern Russia in 1837; visiting Istanbul and Greece. Upon his return, he became a Professor at the Academy; a position he held until 1851, when he retired. His paintings grew to be very popular, and were often engraved by artists in England.

In 1845, he received an appointment as an Imperial Councilor; a largely honorary title. In 1853, he was awarded the Order of Franz Joseph. He made extended visits to Italy in 1855 and 1857.

A street in Vienna's Meidling district was named after him and his brother in 1922.

Selected paintings

Sources 
 
 
 
 Albertina (Vienna), „Von der Schönheit der Natur“ Die Kammermaler Erzherzog Johanns, Exhibition catalog, Klaus Albrecht Schröder and Maria Luise Sternath (Eds.), "Thomas Ender", by Stefanie Hoffmann-Gudehus, pp. 150–214, 2015; Hirmer Verlag GmbH München,

External links 

 More works by Ender @ ArtNet
 Thomas Ender @ Google Arts & Culture
 
 
 Thomas Ender's landscape watercolors @ the Library of the Hungarian Academy of Sciences
 

1793 births
1875 deaths
19th-century Austrian painters
19th-century Austrian male artists
Austrian male painters
Academy of Fine Arts Vienna alumni
Academic staff of the Academy of Fine Arts Vienna
Artists from Vienna